Livin' the Life may refer to:

Livin' the Life (album), by Chris and Lorin Rowan
Livin' the Life, an album by Elbert West

See also
Livin' tha Life, a 2003 American film
Living the Life, a British television talk show